Hatebeak is an American death metal band, formed by Blake Harrison and Mark Sloan, featuring Waldo (b. 1991), a grey parrot. Hatebeak is reported to be the first band to have an avian vocalist. They never tour so as to not torture the bird. Hatebeak is signed to Reptilian Records. They released the album Number of the Beak on June 26, 2015, through Reptilian Records.

The band's sound has been described as "a jackhammer being ground in a compactor". Aquarius Records magazine called Hatebeak "furious and blasting death metal". Hatebeak made its second record with Caninus, a band whose lead singers were two dogs. Hatebeak's goal is to "raise the bar for extreme music".

Band members
 Waldo the Parrot (vocals)
 Mark Sloan (guitar, bass)
 Blake Harrison (drums)

Discography
Beak of Putrefaction split with Longmont Potion Castle (2004)
Bird Seeds of Vengeance split with Caninus (2005)
The Thing That Should Not Beak split with Birdflesh (2007)
The Number of the Beak (2015)
Birdhouse By The Cemetery split with Boar Glue (2018)

See also 
 Zoomusicology
 Biomusic
 Caninus

References

External links
Hatebeak at Metal Archives
Interview with Blacktable.com 
Enough Fanzine - Beak of Putrefaction 
Hatebeak on Bandcamp

American death metal musical groups
American grindcore musical groups
American musical trios
Zoomusicology
Musical groups from Baltimore
Musical groups established in 2003
Musical groups disestablished in 2009
2003 establishments in Maryland